Roché is a surname and given name. Notable people with the name include: 

surname
Betty Roché (1918–1999), American blues singer
Brisa Roché (born 1976), American singer-songwriter
Henri-Pierre Roché (1879–1959), French author 
Sebastian Roché (born 1964), French actor

given name
Roché Emanuelson (born 1982), Surinamese footballer

See also
Roche (surname)